Hal G. Evarts (January 24, 1887 - October 18, 1934) was an American short story writer and novelist. Born in Kansas, he served in World War I, and he became a writer in Los Angeles, California.

References

External links

1887 births
1934 deaths
American military personnel of World War I
American short story writers
Novelists from Kansas
Writers from Los Angeles
Writers from Topeka, Kansas
20th-century American novelists